Cook Ridge is a northeast trending ridge, mostly ice-covered, which parallels the west side of Paternostro Glacier and extends into the southeast corner of Davies Bay. It was first visited in March 1961 by an Australian National Antarctic Research Expeditions (ANARE) airborne survey party led by Phillip Law, and named for surveyor David Cook of the ANARE expedition.

References
 

Ridges of Oates Land